Suren G. Dutia is an advocate for entrepreneurship and has served as a Senior Fellow of the Kauffman Foundation from March 2011 to December 2016. He has also served as a Senior Fellow with the Skandalaris Center for Entrepreneurial Studies, (2010 to 2013) Washington University in St. Louis. From February 2006 to May 2010, Dutia served as the Chief Executive Officer of TiE Global based in Silicon Valley. With 61 chapters in 17 countries, TiE is one of the largest non-profit organizations involved in fostering entrepreneurship globally. Dutia founded the San Diego chapter of TiE in 2000 and was its President for three years. With the Kauffman Foundation, Dutia has been involved in varied initiatives, including building and growing entrepreneurial ecosystems, immigration policy, and mentoring a number of grantees who contribute to fostering innovation and entrepreneurship. Dutia has also authored papers on topics such as Diasporas networks, AgTech, Startup boards and Founder-CEO transition planning. In addition, Dutia also serves on the Advisory Board of the Center for Digital Transformation, University of California, Irvine.

Career and Background
Dutia is an executive with extensive multi-industry leadership experience. As an angel investor, Dutia has invested in a number of business ventures and is currently serving on the Board of Directors or Advisors for a number of startups or entrepreneurial ventures. More recently, Dutia served as an independent director of LifeProof (acquired by Otterbox) and Anvita Health (acquired by Humana), both highly successful exits. Currently, Dutia serves as an independent director on the boards of Flint Rehabilitation Devices, Citius Pharmaceuticals and Vahan, while also advising several other early-stage ventures.

In addition to early-stage companies, Dutia is involved in corporate management since 1981 and has served as President and CEO of Xscribe Corporation, a publicly traded company in San Diego for over 10 years, involved in developing, manufacturing and marketing litigation support software, computer-aided-transcription systems, and high performance scanners. Preceding Xscribe, Dutia held a number of leadership positions with Boston-based Dynatech Corporation for 7 years, including 5-years as President of a medical instruments company and subsequently overseeing the management of 4 subsidiaries.

Prior to working in the private sector, Dutia spent 10 years in the non-profit and public sectors - three (3) years as Deputy Director of the Community Action Agency (War on Poverty), six (6) years as Executive Director for a human services agency created by a consortium of twelve local governments and one year in the U. S. Department of Education in the Carter Administration.

Education
Dutia has a B.S. and M.S. degrees in Chemical Engineering and B.A. in Political Science from Washington University in St. Louis, and holds an MBA degree from the University of Dallas in Irving, Texas. On November 5, 2016, Dutia was honored by Washington University as a Distinguished Alumni for his professional achievements, public service and engagement in university affairs

External links
Suren Dutia appointed to the Board of Directors of Citius Pharmaceuticals Inc. 
Suren Dutia authored Kauffman Foundation paper on Startup Evolution: How and When to Transition from Founder-CEO to New Leadership
Suren Dutia authored Kauffman Foundation paper on Building Effective Board for Growing Startup Companies Presented at the UP Summit 2014
Suren Dutia authored Kauffman Foundation paper on AgTech: Challenges and Opportunities for sustainable growth
Suren Dutia published in Social Science Research Network on Diaspora Networks: A New Impetus to Drive Entrepreneurship 
Suren Dutia published in Forbes on Why Private Equity and Entrepreneurship Don't Mix
Suren Dutia published in Forbes on How A Mentor's Kindness and Transformed My Life
Suren Dutia published in Huffington Post on Entrepreneurship -- Completing the Circle
Suren Dutia published in Huffington Post on Immigrants: Engines of Entrepreneurship and Innovation for Economic Growth
Suren Dutia on Promoting Entrepreneurship, Global Entrepreneurship Program
Suren Dutia on Empowering Incubators
Suren Dutia mentioned in The Economist as a Leading Light at TiE
Suren Dutia speaking at the 10th Anniversary of the Atlanta Chapter - TiE Gala Event

References

McKelvey School of Engineering alumni
American nonprofit chief executives
Living people
Year of birth missing (living people)
University of Dallas alumni
Washington University in St. Louis alumni